Yoon Dong-Sik (윤동식, born August 24, 1972 in Seoul), often anglicised  to Dong-Sik Yoon, is a South Korean judoka, and mixed martial artist.

Career

Judo 
Before competing in MMA, Yoon was a well-known judoka with over 50 international judo competitions under his belt and had a winning streak of 47 straight victories without conceding a single koka, with notable wins over World champions and Olympic gold-medalists such as Makoto Takimoto, Mark Huizinga, Jeon Ki-Young and Toshihiko Koga.  Despite his impressive résumé, Yoon never competed in the Olympics; hence he was given a nickname Judo King Without a Crown.

  
1992 World Youth Championships - 2nd place
1992 Italian Open - gold medal
1993 Asian Championships - 3rd place
1993 German Open - gold medal
1993 Paris Open - 2nd place
1993 Austrian Open - gold medal
1994 Austrian Open - gold medal
1994 Paris Open - gold medal
1994 Goodwill Games - gold medal
1994 Asian Games in Hiroshima - gold medal
1995 Paris Open - gold medal
1996 German Open - gold medal
1998 British Open - gold medal
1999 Iranian Open - gold medal
2000 Asian Championships - gold medal
2001 East Asian Games - gold medal
2001 World Championships - 3rd place

Mixed martial arts (2005–present) 
Yoon made his MMA debut at PRIDE Total Elimination 2005 against legendary Japanese fighter Kazushi Sakuraba. It was a heavily anticipated matchup in both Japan and Korea due to the rivalry between the two nations and it was Sakuraba's comeback match after a ten month absence due to injuries.   With a lack of MMA experience and knowledge, Yoon lost to Sakuraba only 38 seconds into the match.   After the match, Yoon accepted the offer to join Sakuraba's Takada Dojo.  Yoon tasted his first victory in MMA at the K-1 Dynamite!! USA event, where he scored a surprising submission win over heavily favored Dutch kickboxer Melvin Manhoef. Yoon went on to win his second consecutive fight at HERO'S by beating former Cage Rage champion Zelg Galesic by armbar after only 1 minute 29 seconds.

On October 28, 2007 Yoon also beat Fábio Silva by armbar submission making that his third win in K-1 Hero's, his third victory in MMA, and his third consecutive win by armbar. His newfound propensity for finishing opponents with an armbar has led to fans and journalists dubbing the move the "Dongbar" when performed by Yoon.

He was scheduled to face Paulo Filho on October 25, 2009 at DREAM.12, however Filho withdrew at the last minute for unknown reasons. Yoon then faced last minute replacement Tarec Saffiedine and won via split decision.

Mixed martial arts record 

|-
| Loss
| align=center| 9–10
| Ikuhisa Minowa
| TKO (finger injury)
| Road FC 042
| 
| align=center| 2
| align=center| 2:26
| Chungju, South Korea
| Middleweight Match
|-
| Loss
| align=center| 9–9
| Young Choi
| KO (punch)
| Road FC 031
| 
| align=center| 2
| align=center| 2:38
| Seoul, South Korea
| Middleweight Match
|-
| Win
| align=center| 9–8
| Daiju Takase
| Decision (split)
| Road FC 024
| 
| align=center| 3
| align=center| 5:00
| Tokyo, Japan
| Middleweight Match
|-
| Win
| align=center| 8–8
| Amilcar Alves
| Decision (unanimous)
| Road FC 019
| 
| align=center| 3
| align=center| 5:00
| Seoul, South Korea
| Middleweight Match
|-
| Loss
| align=center| 7–8
| Riki Fukuda
| TKO (punches)
| Road FC 016
| 
| align=center| 1
| align=center| 3:36
| Gumi, South Korea
| Middleweight Match
|-
| Win
| align=center| 7–7
| Yong-Hwan Jung
| Submission (armbar)
| Revolution 1 - The Return of Legend 
| 
| align=center| 1
| align=center| 0:46
| Jeongseon, South Korea
| Light Heavyweight Match
|-
| Win
| align=center| 6–7
| Ryo Takigawa
| TKO (corner stoppage)
| K-1 Korea Max 2013 
| 
| align=center| 1
| align=center| 1:25
| Seoul, South Korea
| Middleweight Match
|-
| Win
| align=center| 5–7
| Tarec Saffiedine
| Decision (split)
| Dream 12 
| 
| align=center| 3
| align=center| 5:00
| Osaka, Japan
| Middleweight Match
|-
| Loss
| align=center| 4–7
| Jesse Taylor
| TKO (foot injury)
| Dream 10
| 
| align=center| 1
| align=center| 1:02
| Saitama, Japan
| Middleweight Match
|-
| Loss
| align=center| 4–6
| Andrews Nakahara
| TKO (punches)
| Dream 6: Middleweight Grand Prix 2008 Final Round
| 
| align=center| 2
| align=center| 0:30
| Saitama, Japan
| GP 2005 Middleweight Tournament reserve bout
|-
| Loss
| align=center| 4–5
| Gegard Mousasi
| Decision (unanimous)
| Dream 4: Middleweight Grand Prix 2008 Second Round
| 
| align=center| 2
| align=center| 5:00
| Yokohama, Japan
| GP 2005 Middleweight Tournament Quarterfinal
|-
| Win
| align=center| 4–4
| Shungo Oyama
| Decision (unanimous)
| Dream 2: Middleweight Grand Prix 2008 First Round
| 
| align=center| 2
| align=center| 5:00
| Saitama, Japan
| GP 2005 Middleweight Tournament Round of 16
|-
| Win
| align=center| 3–4
| Fábio Silva
| Submission (armbar)
| Hero's 2007 in Korea
| 
| align=center| 1
| align=center| 6:12
| Seoul, South Korea
| Middleweight Match
|-
| Win
| align=center| 2–4
| Zelg Galesic
| Submission (armbar)
| Hero's 10
| 
| align=center| 1
| align=center| 1:29
| Yokohama, Japan
| 
|-
| Win
| align=center| 1–4
| Melvin Manhoef
| Submission (armbar)
| K-1 Dynamite!! USA HERO's
| 
| align=center| 2
| align=center| 1:17
| California, USA
| Middleweight Match
|-
| Loss
| align=center| 0–4
| Murilo Bustamante
| Decision (unanimous)
| Pride - Bushido 13
| 
| align=center| 2
| align=center| 5:00
| Yokohama, Japan
| Welterweight Match
|-
| Loss
| align=center| 0–3
| Quinton Jackson
| Decision (unanimous)
| Pride 31 - Dreamers
| 
| align=center| 3
| align=center| 5:00
| Saitama, Japan
| Middleweight Match 
|-
| Loss
| align=center| 0–2
| Makoto Takimoto
| Decision (unanimous)
| PRIDE 30 - Fully Loaded
| 
| align=center| 3
| align=center| 5:00
| Saitama, Japan
| Middleweight Match
|-
| Loss
| align=center| 0–1
| Kazushi Sakuraba
| TKO (punches)
| PRIDE Total Elimination 2005
| 
| align=center| 1
| align=center| 0:38
| Osaka, Japan
| GP 2005 Middleweight Tournament Round of 16

Submission grappling record
KO PUNCHES
|- style="text-align:center; background:#f0f0f0;"
| style="border-style:none none solid solid; "|Result
| style="border-style:none none solid solid; "|Opponent
| style="border-style:none none solid solid; "|Method
| style="border-style:none none solid solid; "|Event
| style="border-style:none none solid solid; "|Date
| style="border-style:none none solid solid; "|Round
| style="border-style:none none solid solid; "|Time
| style="border-style:none none solid solid; "|Notes
|-
|Loss|| Marcos de Souza || Submission (armbar) || Quintet || April 11, 2018|| 1|| ||
|-
|Win|| Hideo Tokoro || Submission (sode guruma jime) || Quintet || April 11, 2018|| 1|| ||

References

External links
 
 

1972 births
Living people
Sportspeople from Seoul
South Korean male mixed martial artists
Middleweight mixed martial artists
Light heavyweight mixed martial artists
Mixed martial artists utilizing judo
Asian Games medalists in judo
Judoka at the 1994 Asian Games
South Korean male judoka
Asian Games gold medalists for South Korea
Medalists at the 1994 Asian Games
Goodwill Games medalists in judo
Competitors at the 1994 Goodwill Games